Emanuel Oppliger (born 23 June 1975) is an Australian snowboarder, competing in the parallel giant slalom. He competed in the 2006 Winter Olympics and placed 5th and 15th in the qualification and elimination run. He made it to the 1/8 finals but lost his match-up and ended up being ranked 15th out of 31 competitors.

References

Australian male snowboarders
Olympic snowboarders of Australia
Snowboarders at the 2006 Winter Olympics
Living people
1975 births